In Spanish, the term  (feminine: Porteña) means "port city person". It is used to refer to residents of port cities such as Buenos Aires, Argentina; El Puerto de Santa María, Spain; Valparaíso, Chile; Mazatlán, Veracruz, Acapulco and Tampico, Mexico; Puerto Cabello, Venezuela; Puerto Colombia, Colombia; Puerto Suárez in Bolivia; Puerto Cortés, Honduras; Puntarenas, Costa Rica, and Montevideo, Uruguay.

History

During the wave of European migration to Argentina peaking in the 1880s, the Río de la Plata area became heavily populated with people of European descent, mainly Italian, Spanish and French. They called themselves Porteños to distinguish themselves from existing criollo (colonial Spanish) ancestry, mestizos, indigenous people and mulattoes.

Today

Culture
Porteños have a unique culture, different from that of their initial European homelands. Notably, equestrian sports are a huge part of Porteño life. Porteños are known to be some of the best polo players in the world, and have raised horses through fertile grasslands in the Pampas region. Each year, in November, the Palermo Open, the world's most prestigious Polo championship, takes place in the Palermo section of Buenos Aires.

Also tracing to the inherent geographies of the Pampas, Porteño cuisine consists heavily of beef. For example, the national dish of Argentina is asado.

Demographics
Since Porteño is not officially reportable on any census, estimates differ regarding their population and geography. However, it is estimated that over 3 million Uruguayans identify as Porteño, making up over 90% of the country's population. While not the majority ethnicity in Argentina, Porteños are prominent in the eastern province of Buenos Aires. Outside Buenos Aires City, they make up most of the population, and a significant Porteño diaspora exists in the City's Recoleta, Palermo, and Belgrano neighborhoods.

References

Buenos Aires
Spanish language
Demonyms